Green Sox may refer to a number of defunct baseball teams:

Chicago Green Sox, in the United States Baseball League in 1912
Cleveland Green Sox, in the Federal League in 1913
Dublin Green Sox, in the Georgia State League from 1949-1952
Fremont Green Sox, in the Ohio State League from 1938-1941
Greensburg Green Sox, in the Pennsylvania State Association from 1937-1938
Springfield Green Sox, in the Eastern League in 1917